HMS Phoebe was a  cruiser of the Royal Navy, in service from the early 1890s until 1906.

Service history

Phoebe was built at the HMNB Devonport and launched on 1 July 1890. She served as part of the Cape and West Africa Station from 1893 until 1897. During this time she participated in the Benin Expedition. After spending two years in reserve she left Plymouth for Australia in early March 1901 to commence service on the Australia Station, under Commander (later Captain) Francis Charles Bathurst Addington. She left the Australia Station on 23 December 1905 for England.

Fate
She was paid off and sold in July 1906 to A.Anderson, Copenhagen.

Notes

References
Bastock, John (1988), Ships on the Australia Station, Child & Associates Publishing Pty Ltd; Frenchs Forest, Australia. 

 

1890 ships
Pearl-class cruisers
Victorian-era cruisers of the United Kingdom